The TCDD (Turkish Republic Railways) 45151 Class is a class of 2-8-0 steam locomotives which were acquired from the British War Department to the LMS Stanier Class 8F design. They had a maximum speed of 43 miles per hour (70 km/h), much like their British counterparts.

Background 
On the outbreak of the Second World War British locomotive manufacturers could no longer supply an order for 2-10-0s similar to the TCDD 56001 Class, derived from the German BR 42, for TCDD at the original price and conditions.  (These locomotives were eventually delivered after the war as the TCDD 56080 Class).  However, Nazi Germany stepped in to offer neutral Turkey DRG BR 52-type Kriegsloks which became the 56501 Class.  Diplomatically embarrassed, the British offered the Turks 25 of the LMS Stanier Class 8F 2-8-0s, which had been adopted by the War Department as their standard heavy freight locomotive.

The engines selected were built by the North British Locomotive Company of Glasgow.  Originally intended for WD service but the Fall of France saw them earmarked for the LMS before they were diverted to Turkey.

Shipping 
The locomotives were shipped as a kit of parts (other 8Fs destined for the Middle East went complete) via the Cape of Good Hope and the Suez Canal since the Mediterranean was too dangerous for Allied shipping.  Seven failed to complete the journey.  The vessel transporting them, the SS Jessmore, was involved in a collision in the Atlantic with another ship in the convoy on 19 February 1941.  The Jessmore sank with the loss of its cargo a few days later.  Three more received the same watery fate when the MV Berhala was torpedoed by U-38 on 23 May 1941 off Freetown, Sierra Leone.  The lost engines were:

Service 
The remaining 18 locomotives were transhipped at Port Said in Egypt and went overland to Turkey where they were renumbered 45151-68.  Re-erection was in Sivas under the direction of R.G. Jarvis of the LMS.  In 1943 they were joined by 2 more classmates, (45169/70) taking the class number to 20, in lieu of the lost engines.  These were joined by a gift of 29 of the Lend-Lease S200 Class 2-8-2s which formed the TCDD 46201 Class.

Designed for British conditions, the 8Fs were not suited to Turkish circumstances.  Though large for British engines, they were underpowered by Turkish standards and so could not ascend the steep grades unassisted.  Their lack of drop grates also prevented them from long-distance working.  They were thus relegated to shunting and local trip freights.  The Turkish railwaymen referred to them as "Churchills" after British prime minister Winston Churchill.

The locomotives lasted into the 1980s where they became of special interest of British railway enthusiasts venturing abroad after the demise of steam in Britain.

Preservation 

Three of the Turkish 8Fs have been preserved.  No. 45161 is a static exhibit at the Çamlık Railway Museum.  45168 is preserved and was seen on display at Izmit Station in September 2010. No. 45160 was repatriated to Great Britain in 1989 by the Churchill 8F Locomotive Company Limited where it is Operational on the Gloucestershire Warwickshire Railway.

In October 2010, two of the six remaining derelict examples in Turkey (45166 and 45170) were acquired by the 3 members of the Churchill 8F Locomotive Company Limited. The two locomotives travelled by rail from Sivas depot to Izmir where they were loaded onto a ship for transport back to the UK.
They arrived at Royal Portbury Dock on Boxing Day 2010 aboard the MV Grande Scandinavia (Grimaldi Group). The transportation of the locomotives across Turkey was the subject of an episode of the documentary television series Monster Moves in 2011.

45170 is currently stored in the Museum of Scottish Railways at the Bo'ness & Kinneil Railway awaiting restoration by the Scottish Railway Preservation Society. 45166, meanwhile, was sold to the municipality of Beersheba in Israel in December 2012, and has now been cosmetically restored and put on display at the Be'er Sheva Turkish Railway Station.

References

External links 
 45151 to 45170 Trains of Turkey

45151
LMS Stanier Class 8F
2-8-0 locomotives
NBL locomotives
Steam locomotives of Turkey
Standard gauge locomotives of Turkey
Railway locomotives introduced in 1940